Kodumudi Balambal Sundarambal (1908–1980) was an Indian actress and singer from Erode district, Tamil Nadu. She performed in Tamil cinema and was referred to as the "Queen of the Indian stage." A political activist during the Indian independence movement, K.B. Sundarambal was the first film personality to enter a state legislature in India.

Early years
K.B. Sundarambal was born on 10 October 1908 in the town of Kodumudi on the banks of Kaveri river, in Erode district in Tamil Nadu. As a child, she made money by singing on trains and receiving tips.

Acting career
According to some sources, it was while singing thus on a train for alms that the 19-year-old Sundarambal attracted the attention of F. G. Natesa Iyer, an amateur stage actor, producer and talent-scout. According to other sources, it was a police official named Krishnaswamy Iyer, an acquaintance of Balambal, who discovered the talent in Sundarambal and introduced the 19-year-old girl to P. S. Velu Nair, one of the reigning dramatists of that era.

In either case, Sundarambal is believed to have made her debut in 1927, on the Tamil stage, as a member of a travelling theatre troupe. She honed her voice while performing small roles on stage and keeping audiences entertained between acts. Soon enough, she was playing leading roles on stage. Her early stage plays like "Valli Thirumanam," "Pavalakodi" and "Harishchandra" proved to be great hits. In particular, "Valli Thirumanam", where she co-starred with S.G. Kittappa, was a phenomenal success.

Personal life
While working together in the theatre, Sundarambal met S. G. Kittappa. They were married in 1927. The couple, together became popular. S. G. Kittappa died in 1933. Sundarambal left the stage after his death, to pursue a career as a concert artiste. K.B. Sundarambal died in September 1980.

Filmography

Sundarambal acted in films as well with notable appearances in Manimekhalai, Auvaiyar, Thiruvilayadal, Karaikal Ammaiyar and Kandan Karunai. She portrayed Tamil poet Avvaiyar in films Thiruvilayadal and Kandan Karunai. She also acted in social films such as Uyir Mel Aasai, Thunaivan and Gnayiru Thinggal. Gnayiru Thinggal was an unreleased film.

She sang in movies as well. She worked under music directors Mayavaram Venu, M. D. Parthasarathy, Parur S. Anantharaman, R. Sudharsanam, K. V. Mahadevan, S. M. Subbaiah Naidu, T. K. Ramamoorthy, M. S. Viswanathan and Kunnakudi Vaidyanathan.

Political activism
Sundarambal and her husband S.G. Kittappa had been much influenced by the Indian independence movement and they became ardent supporters of the Indian National Congress. They had harnessed their popularity and talents to further that cause. Sundarambal continued to champion the movement, recording several gramophone discs extolling the struggle and sacrifices it entailed. She also made it a point to always wear khadi. She often actively campaigned in support of Congress party candidates at various elections. After India gained independence, K.B. Sundarambal entered the Legislative Council of Madras State in 1951 as a Congress nominee, thus becoming the first film artist to enter an Indian legislature.

Her mentor C.Satyamurthy was prisoned by the British for participating in Quit India Movement in 1942.

Honours
In 1964, the Tamil Isai Sangam conferred upon her the title of "Tamil Isai Perarignar (Most Learned in Tamil Music)."  In 1970, the government of India awarded her the Padmashri for her contributions to the arts. She was awarded with the National Film Award for Best Female Playback Singer by the Government of India, for her work in Thunaivan. She also won the Tamil Nadu State Film Award for Best Female Playback for Thunaivan in 1969. She was also the first person in the Indian film industry to command a salary of one lakh rupees. She became the first lady member of Tamil Nadu Legislative Assembly.

Further reading
Kodumudi Kokilam K.B. Sundarambal varalaru. Biography in Tamil by P. Chozhanadan. Published by Rishabham Pathippagam, K.K. Nagar, Chennai 600 078.

Footnotes and references

External links

Review of a biography on K.B.Sundarambal
Indian government website on Padmashri
Two awards in 1969
From the Hindu newspaper

1908 births
1980 deaths
Indian stage actresses
Indian women playback singers
Indian independence activists from Tamil Nadu
Tamil Nadu State Film Awards winners
Recipients of the Padma Shri in arts
People from Erode district
20th-century Indian actresses
20th-century Indian singers
Singers from Tamil Nadu
Actresses from Tamil Nadu
Actresses in Tamil cinema
Indian film actresses
20th-century Indian women politicians
20th-century Indian politicians
Women in Tamil Nadu politics
20th-century Indian women singers
Best Female Playback Singer National Film Award winners
Women musicians from Tamil Nadu